Sesame Street Presents: Follow That Bird (or simply Follow That Bird) is a 1985 American musical road comedy film directed by Ken Kwapis and written by Judy Freudberg and Tony Geiss. Based on the long-running popular children's television series Sesame Street created by Joan Ganz Cooney and Lloyd Morrisett, it was the first theatrical feature-length Sesame Street film. It stars Muppet performers Caroll Spinney, Jim Henson and Frank Oz alongside Sandra Bernhard, John Candy, Chevy Chase, Joe Flaherty, Waylon Jennings, and Dave Thomas.

Produced by Children's Television Workshop and Warner Bros, and filmed at the Cinespace Film Studios and on location in the Greater Toronto Area, the film was released in the United States on August 2, 1985 by Warner Bros. and received mostly positive reviews from critics. However, it was a box office disappointment, grossing $13.9 million ($36 million when adjusted for inflation) and resulting in a slight loss for the Children's Television Workshop.

This is the only Sesame Street feature film to star both Henson and Richard Hunt. It was also Henson's final performance as Kermit the Frog (as well as Ernie) in a theatrical Muppets film before his death five years later in 1990. It was followed by The Adventures of Elmo in Grouchland in 1999.

Plot

The Feathered Friends' Board of Birds - an organization whose purpose is to place stray birds with nice bird families - discusses the case of Big Bird. The social worker, Miss Finch, is sent to Sesame Street to find and bring Big Bird to a worthy family of dodos in Ocean View, Illinois. However, he begins to feel uncomfortable with them as they all think poorly of non-birds, and reaches his breaking point when they suggest he should have a bird as a best friend instead of Mr. Snuffleupagus, who is watching over his nest back on Sesame Street.

When Big Bird leaves the Dodos' home to return to Sesame Street, he ends up on the news where Miss Finch tells reporter Kermit the Frog that she intends to find him and bring him back to the Dodos. His friends on Sesame Street also see the news and band together to find him before Miss Finch does, and take various vehicles on their quest after Bob instructs them to head to Toadstool, Indiana to meet up with him. Along the way home, he hitches a ride with a trucker who encourages him to persevere and later meets two kids named Ruthie and Floyd at a farm, who allow him to sleep in their barn overnight. The next morning, Miss Finch arrives and he sneaks away.

Two con artist brothers named Sid and Sam Sleaze, who operate a fraudulent carnival called The Sleaze Brothers Funfair, plot to capture Big Bird and put him on display for profit. When he arrives in Toadstool, Miss Finch does so at the same time and chases him there. After escaping her, Big Bird meets the Sleaze Brothers at their carnival and asks if they have a place to hide, resulting in them putting him in their cage and deciding to paint him blue and tout him as "The Bluebird of Happiness", though he sings sadly about wishing to be back home. Despite this, he brings in plenty of customers.

After the show, two kids sneak backstage to see Big Bird, who asks them to call Sesame Street to inform his friends of his whereabouts. The next morning, his friends sneak into the circus tent and try to set him free. However, the Sleaze Brothers quietly wake up and just as Linda unlocks the cage, they drive off in their truck with it, with Big Bird still inside. Gordon and Olivia give chase in Gordon's Volkswagen Beetle and successfully rescue him after he jumps from the moving truck. Shortly afterwards, a police officer pulls the Sleaze Brothers over for speeding and arrests them on various charges.

Upon arriving back on Sesame Street, Big Bird is happy to be back home until Miss Finch arrives, admitting that the Dodos were not perfect for him and that she has found him another bird family before Maria tells her that he is happy on Sesame Street where it does not matter that his family consists of humans, monsters, grouches, and other species. Considering Maria's statement and realizing how far his friends went to bring him back, a sympathetic Miss Finch officially declares Sesame Street to be his home and happily leaves with her job complete. As everyone celebrates his return, Oscar the Grouch gets carried around the block in his trash can by Bruno the Trashman in order to get over everyone's happiness.

Cast

Muppet Performers

Caroll Spinney as Big Bird, Oscar and Bruno the Trashman
Jim Henson as Kermit the Frog and Ernie
Frank Oz as Cookie Monster, Bert and Grover
Martin P. Robinson as Mr. Snuffleupagus, Telly, Grouch Diner Patron #1, Poco Loco and Bird Member #1
Bryant Young as Mr. Snuffleupagus (Back-End Performer)
Jerry Nelson as The Count, Herry Monster Simon Soundman, Sherlock Hemlock, The Amazing Mumford, and Biff
Sally Kellerman as Miss Finch (Voice)
Cheryl Wagner as Miss Finch (Performer)
Brian Hohlfeld as Daddy Dodo (Voice)
Gord Robertson as Daddy Dodo (Performer)
Laraine Newman as Mommy Dodo (Voice)
Patricia Leeper as Mommy Dodo (Performer)
Eddie Deezen as Donnie Dodo (Voice)
Jeff Weiser as Donnie Dodo (Performer)
Cathy Silvers as Marie Dodo (Voice)
Shari Weiser as Marie Dodo (Performer)
Richard Hunt as Gladys, Bird Member #2 and Sully
Kathryn Mullen as Grouch Diner Patron #2 and Little Girl
Noel MacNeal as Madame Chairbird
Fred Garbo Garver as Turkey, Owl and Barkley
Tim Gosley as Bird Member #3 and Honker
Patricia Leeper as Bird Member #4
Pam Arciero as Grundgetta

Additional Bird Members performed by Bob Stutt, Nikki Tilroe, Lee Armstrong, Rob Mills, and John Pattison.

Additional Muppets performed by Kevin Clash, Frank Meschkuleit, Terry Angus, Matthew Pidgeon, Stephen Brathwaite, Tom Vandenberg, Francine Anderson, Ron Wagner, Martine Carrier, Karen Valleau, Michelle Frey, Gus Harsfai, Patricia Lewis, Charlotte Levinson, Carolanne McLean, Peter McCowatt, Brian Moffatt, Myra Fried, Jani Lauzon and Sandra Shamas.

Humans

Linda Bove as Linda
Emilio Delgado as Luis Rodriguez
Loretta Long as Susan Robinson
Sonia Manzano as Maria Rodriguez
Bob McGrath as Bob Johnson
Roscoe Orman as Gordon Robinson
Alaina Reed as Olivia Robinson
Kermit Love as Willy

Other Humans
Dave Thomas as Sam Sleaze
Joe Flaherty as Sid Sleaze
Alyson Court as Ruthie Darcy
Benjamin Barrett as Floyd Darcy

Guest Stars
Waylon Jennings as the Turkey Truck Driver
Sandra Bernhard as the Grouch Diner Waitress
Paul Bartel as the Grouch Diner Cook
Chevy Chase as the Newscaster
John Candy as the State Trooper

Production

The film was filmed on location in Ontario, Canada (Bolton, Schomberg and Georgetown), and at Toronto International Studios (now Cinespace Film Studios) in 1984. The street set, rebuilt to make it look more realistic than in the television series, was expanded in the film to include a music store, a fire station, an auto body shop, a family clinic, a bakery, a bookstore,  and a grocery store.

According to Noel MacNeal, after filming the footage of Big Bird on the farm with Ruthie and Floyd, the filmmakers discovered that the film was badly scratched and unusable. The actors, crew, and performers promptly had to return to the same location months later in winter, whereupon many of the green leaves in the film are spray-painted and after each take, the kids would run to put their coats on. Early in production, the crew noticed that Oscar's trash can looked too new, so they banged it up and dirtied it to match the one in the television series.

While filming Bert and Ernie's "upside down world" song, Jim Henson and Frank Oz were actually in an upside down biplane eighteen feet from the ground.

After filming wrapped, the filmmakers did not believe that the voice of Cheryl Wagner, who had performed Miss Finch while voicing her simultaneously, seemed appropriate for the character, so her voice was dubbed over by that of Sally Kellerman.

Before Ken Kwapis was chosen to be the director of the film, John Landis (who had previously puppeteered Grover in the "Rainbow Connection" finale in The Muppet Movie) was asked by Warner Bros. to direct the film. He liked it, but dropped out due to scheduling conflicts with Into the Night.

Due to having a criminal record there, Northern Calloway was banned from entering Canada for the film's production; his character, David, is not seen in the film as a result.

Music and soundtrack

Songs 
 "Sesame Street Theme" (Written by Joe Raposo, Jon Stone, and Bruce Hart)
 "The Grouch Anthem" – Oscar the Grouch and the Grouch chorus (Written by Jeff Pennig, Jeff Harrington, and Steve Pippin)
 "Ain't No Road Too Long" – Waylon Jennings, Gordon, Olivia, Cookie Monster, Grover, Count von Count and Big Bird (Written by Jeff Pennig, Jeff Harrington, and Steve Pippin)
 "One Little Star" – Big Bird, Olivia and Mr. Snuffleupagus (Written by Jeff Moss)
 "Easy Goin' Day" – Big Bird, Ruthie and Floyd (Written by Jeff Pennig, Jeff Harrington, and Steve Pippin)
 "Upside Down World" – Ernie and Bert (Written by Jeff Moss)
 "All Together Now" – Alabama (Written by Wood Newton and Michael Noble)
 "Workin' on My Attitude" – Ronnie Milsap (Written by Eddie Setser and Troy Seals)
 "I'm So Blue" – Big Bird (Written by Randy Sharp and Karen Brooks)

Soundtrack

Track List

Side One 
1. "The Grouch Anthem"
2. "Big Bird's Goodbye/The Runaway" - Big Bird, Mr. Snuffleupagus, and Kermit the Frog
3. "Ain't No Road Too Long"
4. "Big Bird on the Farm/One Little Star" - Big Bird, Ruthie, Floyd, Olivia, and Mr. Snuffleupagus
5. "Easy Goin' Day"

Side Two 
6. "Don't Drop Inn/Workin' on My Attitude" - Ronnie Milsap (Written by Eddie Setser and Troy Seals)
7. "Upside Down World"
8. "I'm So Blue"
9. "The Chase/Sesame Street Theme" - Big Bird, Gordon, and Olivia
10. "All Together Now"

Reception

Critical response
The film was a critical success upon its release. On Rotten Tomatoes, the film has a "Fresh" rating of 92% based on 12 reviews, with an average score of 6.40/10.

The Orlando Sentinel called the film "a flip and funny 'road picture' for children that doesn't let its kind heart get in the way of its often biting wit." Walter Goodman observed in The New York Times that "by and large, the script by Tony Geiss and Judy Freudberg and the direction by Ken Kwapis don't strain for yuks; what they seek, and more often than not attain, is a tone of kindly kidding."

Commercial performance

In spite of the near-universal critical acclaim, the film underperformed at the box office due to having opened the same day as Fright Night and Weird Science and faced heavy competition from Back to the Future, Mad Max Beyond Thunderdome, Warner's own Pee-wee's Big Adventure, The Black Cauldron and Warner's own National Lampoon's European Vacation among other films. It grossed merely $2,415,626 on its opening weekend. By the end of its theatrical run, its total gross was $13,961,370. This production, along with other unsuccessful ventures, hurt the Children's Television Workshop financially during the 1980s, though they did recover afterwards.

Home media
The film was first released on VHS and LaserDisc in 1986 and was re-released onto VHS three times by Warner Bros. Family Entertainment starting in 1993, then a second time in 1999 and the third time in 2002 and also on DVD (the opening of it starts with the Warner Home Video logo and a text on a black screen says, "This film has been modified as follows from its original version: it has been formatted to fit your screen", in which it appears in some different movies on DVD). Another DVD release followed in 2004, which was re-issued as a special "25th Anniversary Edition" in 2009 with the original theatrical widescreen version and the new bonus features and cover art intact.

References

External links

 
 

1985 films
1980s English-language films
1980s musical comedy films
1980s children's comedy films
1980s comedy road movies
American musical comedy films
American children's comedy films
American children's musical films
American comedy road movies
Films about birds
Films about missing people
Films based on television series
Puppet films
Sesame Street features
Warner Bros. films
Films directed by Ken Kwapis
Films scored by Lennie Niehaus
Films scored by Van Dyke Parks
Films set in Illinois
Films set in Indiana
Films set in New York City
Films set in New York (state)
Films shot in Illinois
Films shot in Indiana
Films shot in New York City
Films shot in New York (state)
Films shot in Toronto
American films with live action and animation
Dodo
1980s American films